Live 17th October 1974 is a live album by Eric Burdon performed as The Eric Burdon Band.

Track listing

 "Stop"
 "When I Was Young" (Medley)
 "The People Come Runnin'"
 "'Unknown' Instrumental"
 "Mother Earth"
 "House Of The Rising Sun"
 "It's My Life"
 "Metropole"

Title Corrections

 Track 3, "Ghetto Child. The People Come Runnin'" is taken from the chorus of the song.
 Track 4, "'Unknown' Instrumental". It's a live version of the instrumental "Sun Secrets". Burdon added a few lyrics on the live version.
 Track 8, "Metropole". The song was also performed a few times under "New York".

Eric Burdon albums
2009 live albums